BNOC can refer to:

Britoil, originally formed in 1975 as the British National Oil Corporation.
British National Opera Company, (1921-9) first European opera company to broadcast a complete opera.
Basic Noncommissioned Officer Course, previous name for the U.S. Army's Basic Leader Course
Can refer to multi gaming world record holder BNOC SK